Frampton is a village on the Sydney to Melbourne rail line in the north east part of the Riverina about 14 kilometres south west of Cootamundra and eight kilometres north east of Bethungra.

Cungegong Post Office opened on 1 April 1875, was renamed Frampton in June 1889, renamed Moatefield the following month, named Frampton again in 1905 and closed in 1965. A railway station served the locality from 1878 until closure in 1975, and has now been demolished.

References

Cootamundra-Gundagai Regional Council
Main Southern railway line, New South Wales
Towns in the Riverina